Robert Eric Cole (born 11 May 1948) is a South African professional golfer.

Early life
Cole was born in Springs, South Africa. As a child, he was influenced by the careers of Bobby Locke and Gary Player.

After suffering a bicycle accident related knee injury, Cole took up golf at the age of eleven. He won both the South Africa junior golf championship and the Vaal Amateur.

Amateur career
In 1966, Cole won the British Amateur at Carnoustie, Scotland, at age 18, the youngest winner to that stage. Cole held the record as youngest-ever winner of the tournament until Matteo Manassero won the event in 2009, at age 16. Cole also held the record as the youngest player to play in and make the cut at the Masters Tournament, in 1967, at just short of 19 of age, until Manassero, in 2010, again beat his record.

Professional career 
In the fall of 1967, Cole tried out for the PGA Tour at 1967 PGA Tour Qualifying School. He earned medalist honors. In 1974, he claimed both the team and the individual wins in the World Cup. Cole is a two-time winner of the South African Open, 1974 and 1980. In 1986, he won the South African PGA Championship.

On the PGA Tour, Cole won the 1977 Buick Open. He has had nine top-25 finishes in the major championships including a tie for third in the 1975 Open Championship, one stroke out of a playoff. During the event, Cole shot back-to-back rounds of 66, setting and then matching the course record at Carnoustie.

Cole played on the Champions Tour from 1998 to 2001.

Personal life
Cole is married to author Linda Parker. He resides in Windermere, Florida where he teaches private lessons, corporate retreats, and plays ProAms and other golf events. Cole was twice married to 1971 U.S. Women's Amateur champion and LPGA Tour player Laura Baugh, and the couple had seven children together, including professional golfer Eric Cole, who earned a PGA Tour card through the 2022 Korn Ferry Tour Finals.

Amateur wins
1966 British Amateur, Golf Illustrated Gold Vase (tie with Peter Townsend)

Professional wins (13)

PGA Tour wins (1)

Sunshine Tour wins (3) 
1974 South African Open
1980 South African Open
1986 South African PGA Championship

Tournament Player Series wins (1)

Other South African wins (6) 
1969 Natal Open, Dunlop South African Masters
1970 Natal Open
1972 Transvaal Open, Natal Open (Dec), Rhodesian Masters

Other wins (2)

Results in major championships

CUT = missed the half-way cut
"T" indicates a tie for a place

Summary

Most consecutive cuts made – 10 (1974 Open Championship – 1978 PGA)
Longest streak of top-10s – 2 (1974 Open Championship – 1974 PGA)

Team appearances
Amateur
Eisenhower Trophy (representing South Africa): 1966

Professional
World Cup (representing South Africa): 1969, 1974 (winners, individual winner), 1976

See also 
1967 PGA Tour Qualifying School graduates

References

External links

South African male golfers
Sunshine Tour golfers
PGA Tour golfers
PGA Tour Champions golfers
Sportspeople from Gauteng
People from Springs, Gauteng
1948 births
Living people